Ramiro Estrada (born 2 February 1962) is a Mexican swimmer. He competed in three events at the 1984 Summer Olympics.

References

1962 births
Living people
Mexican male swimmers
Olympic swimmers of Mexico
Swimmers at the 1984 Summer Olympics
Place of birth missing (living people)